Astralium heimburgi is a species of sea snail, a marine gastropod mollusk in the family Turbinidae, the turban snails.

Description
The size of the shell varies between 20 mm and 25 mm. The conic shell is imperforate. The five whorls are flattened and subgranosely densely lirate. The periphery is carinated, armed with compressed  imbricated subdeflexed spines. The base of the shell is plano-convex, ornamented with spiral subimbricated lirae. The columella has an oblong excavation at its termination. The aperture is subrotund, silvery margaritaceous within. The shell color is whitish, subroseous at the base.

Distribution
This marine species occurs off Japan and Indonesia.

References

External links
 To GenBank (2 nucleotides; 2 proteins)
 To World Register of Marine Species
 

heimburgi
Gastropods described in 1882